Stone Free: A Tribute to Jimi Hendrix is a 1993 album recorded by various artists in tribute to Jimi Hendrix. The artists were drawn from many genres of popular music. Contributors include his classic rock contemporaries Eric Clapton and Jeff Beck, blues man Buddy Guy, classical violinist Nigel Kennedy, alternative pop/rock bands Belly and Spin Doctors, hip hop artists P. M. Dawn, among others. According to the liner notes, the "artists were encouraged to not only record one of their own personal favorites but to also place their stamp on Jimi's songs." Several artists recorded radically different interpretations, particularly, P. M. Dawn, The Cure, Nigel Kennedy and Pat Metheny. Some artists, on the other hand, recorded versions that were rather similar to the originals.

The band M.A.C.C. is made up of Mike McCready (guitarist from Pearl Jam), Jeff Ament (bassist from Pearl Jam), Matt Cameron (drummer for Soundgarden and later for Pearl Jam), and Chris Cornell (singer of Soundgarden and later Audioslave). The cover of "Hey Baby (Land of the New Rising Sun)" is their only known recording. All four members of this group had previously worked together on the Temple of the Dog project, and the song "Hey Baby (Land of the New Rising Sun)" was added to Temple of the Dog's live set in 2016.

Eric Clapton's backing group on the title track includes the three original core members of Chic (Nile Rodgers, Bernard Edwards and Tony Thompson) and is the last recording on which all three played together.

Track listing

References

1993 compilation albums
Jimi Hendrix tribute albums
Albums produced by Eddie Kramer
Albums produced by Stephen Street
Albums produced by Nile Rodgers
Rock compilation albums
Reprise Records compilation albums